Cantharellus cinnabarinus, the red chanterelle, is a fungus native to eastern North America. It is a member of the genus Cantharellus along with other chanterelles.  It is named after its red color, which is imparted by the carotenoid canthaxanthin.  It is edible and good, fruiting in association with hardwood trees in the summer and fall.

Description 
Cantharellus cinnabarinus is recognized by its distinctive flamingo-pink or bright orange and red colors (imparted by the carotenoid canthaxanthin) and the presence of false gills underneath the cap.

Ecology 
Widely distributed in Eastern Northern America; found mostly on the ground in broadleaf and mixed broadleaf/conifer forests; usually scattered or occurring in small groups; forms mycorrhizal associations with forest trees in the summer and fall; shows preference for acid soils.

References

External links

cinnabarinus
Fungi described in 1832
Fungi of North America
Edible fungi
Taxa named by Lewis David de Schweinitz